The 1962 United States Senate special election in Massachusetts was held on November 6, 1962. The election was won by Ted Kennedy, the youngest brother of then-President John F. Kennedy, who would remain Senator until his death in 2009.

With professor H. Stuart Hughes, the grandson of Charles Evans Hughes, running a serious independent campaign, this election also featured three of America's most prominent political families.

Background
Senator John F. Kennedy of Massachusetts was elected President of the United States in November 1960. At the same time, Republican John Volpe was elected to succeed scandal-plagued Democrat Foster Furcolo as Governor of Massachusetts while Republican Leverett Saltonstall was re-elected to the U.S. Senate. Under the Seventeenth Amendment, the sitting state Governor has the authority to temporarily fill vacancies in the Senate as soon as they arise. With Volpe scheduled to take office on January 5, 1961, the Kennedys were thus compelled to engage in time-sensitive negotiations with Furcolo regarding the successor to Kennedy's Senate seat.

Furcolo initially hoped to appoint himself to Kennedy's vacant seat. He was dissuaded from this course of action under strong pressure from the Kennedys. The incoming president was not only keen to maintain a Democratic presence from his home state in the Senate but under strong pressure from his father Joseph P. Kennedy to ensure the seat remained in the family. With a strong Democratic majority in the Senate assured in any case, the Kennedy family made it clear to Furcolo that they would be content to challenge whoever Volpe might have appointed to the seat in 1962 and in any event would not support any election bid from Furcolo.

It was initially speculated that Kennedy's brother Robert F. Kennedy, who managed the presidential campaign and was the president-elect's only surviving brother old enough to serve in the Senate, would be the family's choice to succeed John F. Kennedy in the Senate. However, at the insistence of the family patriarch and to some controversy, the president-elect agreed to nominate Robert for Attorney General of the United States. Joseph Kennedy effectively nominated Benjamin A. Smith II, a Kennedy family friend and roommate of his deceased eldest son Joseph P. Kennedy Jr., to be duly appointed by Furcolo to succeed John F. Kennedy after the president-elect officially resigned on December 22. Smith served as a placeholder for Edward M. "Ted" Kennedy, who, at the time, was too young to be constitutionally eligible for the seat.

Democratic primary

Candidates

Declared
 Ted Kennedy, younger brother of President John F. Kennedy and Attorney General Robert F. Kennedy
 Edward J. McCormack, Jr., Massachusetts Attorney General and nephew of House Speaker John W. McCormack

Declined
 Benjamin A. Smith II, incumbent Senator

Campaign
Ted Kennedy first faced a Democratic Party primary challenge from Edward J. "Eddie" McCormack, Jr., the state Attorney General and nephew of U.S. Speaker of the House John W. McCormack. McCormack had the support of many liberals and intellectuals, who thought Kennedy inexperienced ("I back Jack, but Teddy ain't ready") and knew of his suspension from Harvard, which was publicized during the race.

Kennedy's slogan was, "He can do more for Massachusetts", the same one John F. Kennedy had used in his first campaign for the seat ten years earlier. Kennedy also faced the notion that with one brother the President and another the United States Attorney General, "Don't you think that Teddy is one Kennedy too many?". Nevertheless, Kennedy proved to be an effective street-level campaigner, with great personal appeal.

In a televised debate, McCormack argued that, "The office of United States Senator should be merited, and not inherited", and that if his opponent's name was Edward Moore, rather than Edward Moore Kennedy, his candidacy "would be a joke". A Kennedy supporter said that "McCormack was able to make a millionaire an underdog". With the public's sympathy and the family political machine, Kennedy won 69% of the vote in the September 1962 primary.

Convention
A delegate at the state Democratic convention said, "He's completely unqualified and inexperienced. And I'm going to be with him." Kennedy won on the first ballot at the convention.

Results

Source: Our Campaigns - MA US Senate - D Primary Race - Sep 18, 1962

Republican primary

Candidates
 Laurence Curtis, U.S. Representative from Newton
 George C. Lodge, U.S. Assistant Secretary of Labor for International Affairs and son of former Senator Henry Cabot Lodge Jr.

Results

General election

Candidates
 Lawrence Gilfedder, perennial candidate (Socialist)
 H. Stuart Hughes, Harvard University historian and grandson of Charles Evans Hughes (Independent)
 Ted Kennedy, brother of President John F. Kennedy (Democratic)
 George C. Lodge, Assistant U.S. Secretary of Labor and son of former Senator Henry Cabot Lodge, Jr. (Republican) 
 Mark R. Shaw, perennial candidate (Prohibition)

Campaign
Well aware that he was also from a  political family, and not much older than Kennedy, Lodge avoided making the same sort of attacks attempted by McCormack. Besides Kennedy and Lodge, independent candidate H. Stuart Hughes was considered a serious contender, being invited to two televised debates with Lodge. (Kennedy, by then an overwhelming favorite to win the election, declined to participate.) Any chance that Hughes might have had of winning the election, or even receiving widespread support, was destroyed in the aftermath of the Cuban Missile crisis, only weeks before the election, in which the President and his brother Robert F. Kennedy took the nation "to the brink" of nuclear confrontation with the Soviet Union. Hughes, who supported nuclear disarmament, suddenly seemed unrealistic and out of touch as a result. He ultimately received just over two per cent of the vote, and far fewer votes than signatures.

Results
In the November special election, Kennedy defeated Lodge with 55 percent of the vote. Lodge's father had lost the same seat to then-Representative John F. Kennedy in 1952. Political science professor Murray Levin stated that Kennedy's youth and political inexperience made him an innocent outsider, while his wealth made him incorruptible. The prosecutor had become a Senator, Levin said, "with one year of frantic campaigning and 30 years of experience as a Kennedy".

Source:

References

Massachusetts
1962
Massachusetts 1962
Senate
Massachusetts
United States Senate 1962